Video Clip or VDO Clip is a 2007 Thai horror film directed by Pakphum Wonjinda.

Plot
Mobile phones today come with a host of novel features to entertain their users. But a dark side hides amid their use. This film features a group of people obsessed with mobile phone video recording: Ken (Paopol Thephasdin) is a mobile phone repair man who has steals private video clips from his customers’ phones; Pub DJ Aud (Warot Pitakanonda) likes having fun with girls and records those adventures on his phone to share with others; and Gaeng (Nuttapong Tangkasam), the pub owner who creates a porn website featuring mobile phone video clips. However, none of the characters realise their mobile phone habit is to become a threat to their lives.

Cast 
 Ngamsiri Arsira-Lertsiri as Meena
 Warot Pitakanonda as Awt
 Nuttapong Tangkasam as Sia Gayng
 Paopol Thephasdin as Ken
 Sumonrat Wattanaselarat as Amy

External links 
 
 

2007 films
Thai horror films
2007 horror films